Snowplume Peak is a small pyramidal peak along the north front of the Jones Mountains, located 0.75 nautical miles (1.4 km) west-southwest of Rightangle Peak and 2 nautical miles (3.7 km) west-southwest of Pillsbury Tower. It was mapped by the University of Minnesota Jones Mountains Party of 1960–61. It was so named by the party because a continual plume of wind-blown snow trails off the peak whenever the wind blows.

Mountains of Ellsworth Land